Thermanaerothrix is a bacteria genus from the family of Anaerolineaceae with one known species (Thermanaerothrix daxensis). Thermanaerothrix daxensis has been isolated from water from the Saint-Christophe spring in France.

References

Further reading 
 

Chloroflexota
Bacteria genera
Monotypic bacteria genera